Joseph Hayden may refer to:

 Joseph Haydn (1732–1809), Austrian composer
 Joseph B. Hayden (1834–?), U.S. Navy sailor and Medal of Honor recipient